Canadian Line Materials LTD. (CLM) was a Canadian siren manufacturing company which built civil defense sirens. These sirens were built and installed all over Canada to warn residents and military about incoming nuclear attacks from the USSR during the Cold War. 

Though most CLM sirens are now decommissioned or removed, few are owned privately, with rumors about one being refurbished and put back in service in Dashwood, Ontario.

History 
Canadian Line Materials was a Canadian electrical manufacturing company which began business in 1957 as a division from McGraw-Edison in Scarborough, Toronto and built electrical equipment such as lightning arresters. Shortly after they began business during the Cold War, the Canadian government contacted CLM asking if they could make civil defense sirens to warn civilians and military about incoming Soviet nuclear attacks that were confirmed by NORAD. CLM accepted and began production of their sirens, installing over 1600+ sirens all over Canada. In 1985, CLM was sold to Cooper Industries, and no longer exists.

Siren models 
The CLM Model 92729DP siren (rotational CLM) is a 10/12 port rotating electromechanical siren. The decibel rating of the model is ~130 decibels. These sirens use Lincoln Electric 5 horsepower induction motors. This model of CLM is the most well-known and recognizable warning siren made by CLM. 

The CLM Model 92730DP siren (another rotational CLM) is presumably a similar siren to the 92729DP. There is not much info on this particular model.

The CLM "Mailbox" siren series. These sirens are omni-directional 10/12 or 20/24 port electromechanical sirens with a design similar to the WW2 Carter siren. They are housed inside of a mailbox-style housing, earning its name. These sirens use unknown Lincoln Electric motors. The decibel rating on these model is unknown, as nobody has done a decibel rating test or nobody has heard one on full power. Most of these have been decommissioned or removed. Known model numbers of these sirens are the 5563, 5263, 5223, and 5261.

The CLM omni-directional siren. The model number on this is 92763CP. It is a oddly designed 10/12 port omnidirectional electromechanical siren. The decibel ratings on these sirens are unknown, as nobody has heard one on full power. All of these have been decommissioned or removed.

National distribution of sirens installed

Other Mentions 
The Bluesmobile is a 1974 Dodge Monaco from the film The Blues Brothers. The Loudspeaker mounted atop the vehicle as a public warning siren was modelled after a CLM Model 92729DP. This specific model of siren was requested by the co-writer, Dan Aykrod.

References

External links 

Rotational CLM siren sounding
Vandalized Rotational CLM siren rotating
CLM 20/24 siren with a custom housing sounding
Air Raid Sirens - Fallen CLM siren
Rotational CLM siren sounding and rotating in distance

Civil defense
Emergency population warning systems in Canada
Sirens